The 2016 Danmark Rundt (officially PostNord Danmark Rundt 2016 for sponsorship reasons) was a men's road bicycle race which was held from 27 July to 31 July 2016. It was the 26th edition of Danmark Rundt, which was established in 1985. The race was rated as a 2.HC event and formed part of the 2016 UCI Europe Tour. The race was made up of five stages over five days and included an individual time trial.

Teams
A total of 16 teams with 8 riders each raced in the 2016 Danmark Rundt: 3 UCI WorldTeams, 8 UCI Professional Continental teams, 4 UCI Continental Teams along with a Danish national team under the Team Postnord Danmark name. PostNord was the name sponsor of the race.

Schedule
There were five stages over five days with an individual time trial on day four.

Classifications

Classification leadership

References

External links
 Official site (Danish)

Danmark Rundt
Danmark Rundt
Danmark Rundt